Fagnano Castello is a town and comune in the province of Cosenza in the Calabria region of southern Italy.
Fagnano Castello is located in the mountains of  Calabria, about an hour north of Cosenza.

The town's big annual festival is the Sagra Della Castagna (Festival of Chestnuts), celebrating the annual chestnut harvest around the last week of October with live music, free roasted chestnuts in the village square, and homemade desserts made out of chestnuts.

References

Cities and towns in Calabria